Winston Houghton Rekert (June 10, 1949 – September 14, 2012) was a Canadian actor. He was best known for starring in the television series Adderly and Neon Rider.

Career

A Vancouver native, Rekert started acting at age 12, appearing in an amateur production of Amahl and the Night Visitors.   After high school, Rekert spent a year working in a logging camp, then took a year off to try acting.  Rekert subsequently joined the Arts Club Theatre Company and in 1973 he landed his first television role on the comedy-drama The Beachcombers.

In 1985 Rekert played the role of Detective Langevin in the American film Agnes of God. In the same year, he received a Genie Award nomination for Best Actor at the 6th Genie Awards for his performance in the film Walls.

From 1986 to 1988 Rekert starred as the lead character in the Canadian television series Adderly, a comedy drama that was a spoof of the spy genre.  In 1987 Rekert won a Gemini Award for Best Performance by a Lead Actor in a Continuing Dramatic Role for his work on the series.

Following Adderly cancellation, Rekert's childhood friend, Danny Virtue, pitched him an idea for a television series that eventually became Neon Rider.  The series ran from 1990 to 1995 and starred Rekert as Michael Terry, a therapist who ran a ranch for troubled adolescents. Rekert also worked on the series as a writer, director and producer. Through the show Rekert became involved with a variety of youth groups and was named the national spokesman for Youth at Risk.

In 2003 Rekert won his second Gemini Award for Best Performance by an Actor in a Guest Role in a Dramatic Series for his appearance on the television series Blue Murder.

Over the course of his career, Rekert made guest appearances on many Canadian and American television series filmed in Vancouver, including Cold Squad, Supernatural, Stargate SG-1 and Battlestar Galactica.

In April 2012 the Union of B.C. Performers awarded Rekert with the Sam Payne Lifetime Achievement Award—an annual award that "recognizes professional performers displaying humanity, artistic integrity and encouragement of new talent."

Death

Rekert died on September 14, 2012 at the age of 63 after a three-year battle with cancer.

Filmography

References

External links

1949 births
2012 deaths
Male actors from Vancouver
Canadian male television actors
Best Actor in a Drama Series Canadian Screen Award winners
Deaths from cancer in British Columbia
20th-century Canadian male actors
21st-century Canadian male actors